A Call to Arms is the 2001 debut EP by Bandits of the Acoustic Revolution, a musical collective headed by Tomas Kalnoky (of Streetlight Manifesto and early Catch 22). It was released by Kalnoky's record label, Pentimento Music Company, in 2001, and quickly garnered critical acclaim.

Track listing

References

2001 debut EPs